Tabanovce is a village located in the north of North Macedonia, at the border with Serbia, situated 8 km from the nearest town, Kumanovo.

Geography
It is located in the north of North Macedonia, at the border with Serbia, situated 8 km from the nearest town, Kumanovo.

History
Fight in Tabanovce (1905)

Demographics
As of the 2021 census, Tabanovce had 817 residents with the following ethnic composition:
Serbs 294 (36.0%)
Macedonians 241 (29.5%)
Albanians 211 (25.8%)
Persons for whom data are taken from administrative sources 67 (8.2%)
Others 4 (0.5%)

According to the 2002 census, the village had a total of 910 inhabitants. Ethnic groups in the village include:
Serbs 516 (56,7%)
Macedonians 205 (23,2%)
Albanians 177 (19,5%)
Others 12 (1,3%)

Culture
The unusual ending "-ce" (-це) as opposed to "-ci" (-ци) (e.g. Kavadarci) reflects the local dialect, which is a form of Torlakian, similar to what is spoken in Kumanovo, and by the Serb population of Preševo.

Kodža Mehmet Beg Mosque

References

External links

Villages in Kumanovo Municipality
North Macedonia–Serbia border crossings
Albanian communities in North Macedonia
Serb communities in North Macedonia